Xiphinema insigne is a plant pathogenic nematode infecting tea. They are known to infect cacao trees.

Distribution
They are known to live in the Philippines. It also resides in China, where it is the most common of all of the Xiphinema nematodes.

Characteristics
There is a great deal of interspecies variation within the Xiphinema insigne population, generally variations are due to, or at least correlate with, geographical or climate differences.

See also
 List of tea diseases

References

Agricultural pest nematodes
Cacao diseases
Longidoridae